Hagenow-Land is an Amt in the Ludwigslust-Parchim district, in Mecklenburg-Vorpommern, Germany. The seat of the Amt is in Hagenow, itself not part of the Amt.

The Amt Hagenow-Land consists of the following municipalities:

Ämter in Mecklenburg-Western Pomerania